Wörndle is a German surname. Notable people with the surname include:

Matthias Wörndle (1909–1942), German cross-country skier
Roman Wörndle (1913–1942), German alpine skier

See also
Von Wörndle

German-language surnames